White Wolf is a campground and concession area outside of Yosemite Valley in the northern area of Yosemite National Park along Tioga Road (Highway 120). The campground is directly off the road and thus does not require a rough drive to the campground such as other Yosemite campgrounds outside of the valley. White Wolf Campground contains 74 campsites and has the look and feel of Bridalveil Creek Campground. The campground is not near a creek and is quite rocky and sunny. The area also includes a cluster of wood-and-canvas cabins and a small restaurant and general store.

Settlement in the White Wolf area by Europeans  began in the early 20th century, after the construction of the Tioga Road. The first structures were likely shelters for ranch hands, and by 1930 the area was home to a small resort which included tents, tourist cabins, a small store and restaurant, and a gas station. After a drop in tourism following World War II and the relocation of the highway, the land was purchased by the government, with concession rights held by the Yosemite Park and Curry Co. The public campground was improved in 1960-1961.
	
Sources differ on the origin of the name. According to one story, cattlemen pursuing horse thieves in 1850 came upon an encampment of Indians led by a tribal chief whose name was White Wolf, and named the place after him. Another story is that it was named by a sheepherder who saw a white wolf in the area.

Destinations nearby
Yosemite Creek Campground
Porcupine Flat Campground Campground
Olmsted Point
Tenaya Lake
Tuolumne Meadows
Tamarack Flat Campground
Crane Flat Campground
Yosemite Valley

References

External links
 White Wolf Campground
 Yosemite Discussion

Buildings and structures in Yosemite National Park
Campgrounds in California